Lagria is a genus of beetles in the family Tenebrionidae.

Lagria villosa is a significant pest of crops.

Species
Species recorded in Europe include the following:

Species native to Africa include:

References 

Lagriinae
Tenebrionidae genera
Taxa named by Johan Christian Fabricius